Jocara rubralis is a species of snout moth. It is found in Colombia.

References

Moths described in 1916
Jocara